Taoyuan International Airport  is an international airport serving Taipei and northern Taiwan. It was also the busiest airport in Taiwan before the COVID-19 pandemic which began in 2020. It is operated by the Taoyuan International Airport Corporation. In 2016, it was ranked the best airport for its size in the Asia-Pacific region by Airports Council International.

The airport opened for commercial operations in 1979 as Chiang Kai-shek International Airport and was renamed in 2006. It is an important regional trans-shipment center, passenger hub, and gateway for destinations in Asia, and is one of two international airports that serve Taipei. The other, Taipei Songshan Airport, is located within city limits and served as Taipei's only international airport until 1979. Songshan now mainly serves chartered flights, intra-island flights, and limited international flights.

In 2018, Taoyuan International Airport handled a record 46.5 million passengers and 2.3 billion kg of freight, making it the 11th busiest airport worldwide by international passenger traffic, and 8th busiest in terms of international freight traffic in 2018. It is the main international hub for China Airlines, EVA Air and Starlux Airlines. It is also a hub of Mandarin Airlines, Uni Air and Tigerair Taiwan.

History
In the 1970s, the original airport in Taipei City — Taipei Songshan Airport — had become overcrowded and could not be expanded due to space limitations. Thus, a new airport was planned to alleviate congestion. The new airport opened (with Terminal 1) on 26 February 1979, as part of the Ten Major Construction Projects pursued by the government in the 1970s. The airport was originally planned under the name Taoyuan International Airport but was later changed to Chiang Kai-shek International Airport in memory of former President Chiang Kai-shek.

The airport is the main hub of China Airlines, the Republic of China's flag carrier, as well as EVA Air, a private airline established in 1989. Overcrowding of the airport in recent years prompted the construction of Terminal 2, which was opened on 29 July 2000, with half of its gates operational; EVA Air was the first airline to move into Terminal 2. The remaining gates opened on 21 January 2005 for China Airlines, making China Airlines the only airline to operate from both terminals.

The airport has announced construction plans for a third terminal. In October 2015, the design of British firm Rogers Stirk Harbour + Partners, founded by Pritzker Architecture Prize-laureate Richard Rogers, was chosen for the 640,000 square meter Terminal 3. Over US$2.3 billion will be poured into the project, among the most costly constructions in modern Taiwanese history. The terminal is expected to be opened in 2020 and accommodate 45 million passengers per year, boosting the yearly capacity of the airport to 86 million passengers.

Formerly known as Chiang Kai-shek International Airport, it was renamed on 6 September 2006 to its current name.
The airport, originally planned as Taoyuan International Airport, bore the name of late President Chiang Kai-shek until 2006. In Chinese, its former name was literally "Chung-Cheng (Zhongzheng) International Airport", where Chung-Cheng is the legal given name that Chiang Kai-shek had used since the 1910s. In Taiwan, Chiang Kai-shek is associated with the Chinese Nationalist Party or Kuomintang and its many years of one-party authoritarian rule. Local officials in Taoyuan City and members of the Pan-Green Coalition often referred to the hub by the name originally associated with it: "Taoyuan International Airport". News organizations and local residents sometimes combined the two commonly used names as "Taoyuan Chung-Cheng Airport."

The Executive Yuan of then-President Chen Shui-bian's administration officially approved the name Taiwan Taoyuan International Airport for the hub on 6 September 2006. The opposition Kuomintang, which together with its political allies held a one-vote majority in the Legislative Yuan, decried the change and proposed "Taiwan Taoyuan Chiang Kai-shek International Airport" instead. The disagreement, like those affecting the names of the Chiang Kai-shek Memorial Hall and other landmarks in Taiwan, stands as another manifestation of the Taiwan localization efforts by pan-Green officials and resistance against it by Pan-Blue Coalition. The media in mainland China has always referred to the airport as "Taoyuan International Airport" so as to avoid mentioning Chiang Kai-shek.

Terminals

Taiwan Taoyuan International Airport currently has two terminals, which are connected by two short people movers. The third terminal is under construction, while the fourth terminal is planned, however plans may be halted. The Taoyuan Airport MRT links the terminals together underground, and provides transportation to Taipei City.

Terminal 1

Terminal 1 is the original passenger terminal of the Taiwan Taoyuan International Airport. The building was designed by Chinese-born, Taiwanese-American structural engineer Tung-Yen Lin and influenced by Eero Saarinen's Washington Dulles International Airport. The five-storey,  terminal, along with the airport, opened in 1979 to relieve the overcrowded Taipei Songshan Airport. All international flights were moved to the airport following the completion of this terminal. Terminal 1 featured 22 gates. A row of 11 gates are located on the north end of the airfield facing the north runway and another row of 11 gates are located on the south end airfield facing the south runway. The two concourses that contained the airplane gates are linked together by a main building that contained the check-in areas, baggage claim, passport immigration areas, and security checkpoint areas. Together they form a giant "H". All gates are equipped with jetways. Gates located at the end of the concourses have one jetway and also reducing people and gates not located at the end of the concourses have two jetways. The terminal was originally white in color when it first opened. As the years gradually passed, the façade and color has become more tan and yellow colored due to air pollution in Taipei.

After the completion of Terminal 2, some gates from Terminal 1 were removed to make space for Terminal 2. Currently Terminal 1 has 18 gates. Alphabetical letters were introduced when Terminal 2 was completed. The north concourse is now Concourse A and the south concourse is now Concourse B. Before Terminal 2, gates were numbered from 1 to 22. China Airlines uses Concourse A for the majority of its flights in Terminal 1, while the third largest carrier of the airport, Cathay Pacific, operates most of its flights at Concourse B.

In 2012, the renovation project of the terminal, designed by Japanese architect Norihiko Dan, was completed, doubling the floor area, expanding check-in counters, increasing shopping areas and expanding car-parking facilities. Part of the project was the complete redesigning of both the exterior and interior of the terminal. The capacity of Terminal 1 is 15 million passengers per year. This renovation received the 2014 Taiwan Architecture Award from the Taiwan Architects Association.

Terminal 2

Terminal 2 opened in 2000 to reduce heavy congestion in the aging Terminal 1. Only the South Concourse had been completed by the time the terminal opened. The South Concourse alone has 10 gates, each with 2 jetways and their own security checkpoints. The North Concourse opened later in 2005, bringing the total number of gates for Terminal 2 to 20 gates; the security checkpoints were moved to a central location in front of the passport control. The 318,000-m2 facility is capable of handling 17 million passengers per year.

The Southern and Northern Concourses are also known as Concourse C and Concourse D, respectively. Terminals 1 and 2 are connected by two short people mover lines, with one from Concourse A to D, and the other from B to C. China Airlines uses Concourse D for the majority of its flights in Terminal 2 while EVA Air uses Concourse C for most of its operations.

Terminal 2 was planned to increase the terminal's annual passenger capacity by 5 million to 22 million per annum in 2018. Currently Terminal 2 is undergoing renovation.

Terminal 3 (under construction)

Construction of Terminal 3 is part of the expansion project of Taoyuan International Airport. The 640,000 square meter Terminal 3 is designed by Rogers Stirk Harbour + Partners and will accommodate 45 million passengers per year. The new terminal was originally planned to be opened in 2020. However, the project has been delayed, which postpones its targeted completion to 2025.

Terminal 4 (plans halted)
Originally part of the expansion project was a new Terminal 4. However, due to the vast amount of construction, the Ministry of Transportation ordered the airport company to halt the project in order to minimize traveller inconvenience.

Airlines and destinations

Passenger

Cargo

Operations

Statistics

Busiest routes

The airport is operated by the Taoyuan International Airport Corporation, a company wholly owned by the Government of Taiwan. The Civil Aeronautics Administration (CAA) is responsible for the provision of air traffic control services, certification of Taiwan registered aircraft, and the regulation of general civil aviation activities.

The airport has two parallel runways, with one 3660 meters in length and another 3800 meters in length and both 60 meters wide, enabling them to cater to the next generation of aircraft. Both runways have been given a Category II Precision Approach, which allows pilots to land in only 350-metre visibility. The two runways have an ultimate capacity of over 60 aircraft movements an hour. The Airport is upgrading ATC and runways.

There are 41 frontal stands at the main passenger concourse, 15 remote stands and 25 cargo stands. In 2015, the airport was the 11th busiest airport worldwide in terms of international passenger numbers, and sixth busiest in terms of international freight traffic.

The operation of scheduled air services to and from Taoyuan is facilitated by air services agreements between Taiwan and other countries. Since the opening of RCTP, the Taiwan Government has implemented a policy of progressive liberalisation of air services with the intention of promoting consumer choice and competition. Many low-cost airlines have started various regional routes to compete head-on with full-service carriers on trunk routes.

The airport's long term expansion opportunities are subject to variables. A NTD 300 billion proposal to build a third runway and a third terminal has been under feasibility study and consultation.

Airport facilities

Terminal transit

Transportation between Terminal 1 and 2 is provided by the TTIA Skytrain, which transports both passengers who have cleared security and those who have not through separate train cars. The other way is by taking Taoyuan Airport MRT, It offers free fare between A12 and A13 and Airport Hotel with an electronic ticket (Easy Card, i-pass).

Airport Business Center

Taiwan Taoyuan International Airport finished developing the airports business travel center in late 2011. The facility is a three-story building located between the first and second terminals. Business travelers paying to use the travel center can drive into the airports restricted zone and park their cars directly in front of the building. This allows business travelers to arrive at the airport much closer to the actual departure time versus arriving two hours before departure time like most regular international passengers are required to do. The business center is equipped with over 15 isolated areas allowing travelers to eat their meals without any distractions or disruptions. The facility also includes a spa, sauna, and gymnasium that are available for use by travelers. However, all of these luxuries come with a one-time price tag of $8,000. Travelers who wish to use the facility must make reservations at least three days in advance. Statistics showed that 376 private jets landed and departed the airport through a six-month timeframe in 2011; this is a 100 percent increase from the same time frame in 2010.

Huan Yu VIP Terminal

Huan Yu VIP Terminal, also known as the Taoyuan Business Aviation Centre (TYBAC), began service in September 2011 and was officially opened in mid-October 2011. The three-story facility will have its own terminal and facilities separate from the public terminals. It will provide a multimedia conference room, passenger lounge, private rooms and showers, spa, sauna, gym, and business centre facilities. Other services that will be provided include ground handling, baggage handling, fuelling, security, customs and flight planning. Passengers planning to utilize TYBAC must sign up (to the Taiwanese immigration service) 3 days before use.

E-gate

Passengers who are citizens of the R.O.C (Taiwan) with valid passports or non-citizens who have ROC (Taiwan) Resident Certificate (ARC/APRC) can register with facial features and fingerprints for the E-Gate. After registration, the passengers are able to choose either E-Gate or manual immigration clearance when entering or leaving the country.

Baggage and cargo facilities

The handling and transportation of mail, passenger baggage, cargo, and the operation of aerobridges and passenger stairways in Taoyuan Airport is provided by Taoyuan International Airport Services Limited (TIAS) and Evergreen Airline Services (EGAS).

TTIA currently handles over 1.5 million tonnes of cargo annually. There are two air cargo terminals in the airport: one operated by Taiwan Air Cargo Terminals Limited and the other operated by Evergreen Air Cargo Services.

Aircraft maintenance services
China Airlines Engineering and Maintenance Organization (CALEMO) and Evergreen Aviation Technologies (EGAT) both offers maintenance services at the airport. With its huge base, CALEMO, with a market share of over 75%, can offer maintenance service of five huge airliners at a time, for example Boeing 747, or three Boeing 747s and another Airbus A330 at a time. In addition, EGAT is capable of aircraft conversion programs, such as the Dreamlifter program.

In 2022 aerospace company Nordam opened a major components repair facility at Taoyuan which will serve as their regional hub replacing operations in Singapore.

Ground transportation

Bus
Frequent buses link the airport to Taipei, Taoyuan, Zhongli, Taichung, Banqiao, Changhua, and THSR's Taoyuan Station. Bus terminals are present at both terminals.

Rail
 Taoyuan Airport MRT: Links both terminals at the airport to Taipei and Zhongli District, Taoyuan City. Free Wi-Fi and wireless charging services provided on trains. Passengers flying China Airlines, EVA Air, Mandarin Airlines, and UNI Air can utilize downtown check-in and luggage facilities at Taipei Main Station.
 Express train: 38-minute link between the airport and downtown Taipei. Stops at both airport terminals, Chang Gung Memorial Hospital, New Taipei Industrial Park, and Taipei Main Station.
 Commuter train: 45-minute link between the airport and downtown Taipei. Stops at all 21 stations on the line.

Taxi
Taxi queues are outside the arrival halls of both terminals and are available 24 hours a day. They are metered and subject to a 15-percent surcharge.

Car rental
Car rentals are available at both terminals. The airport is served by National Highway No. 2.

Other facilities

CAL Park
China Airlines has its headquarters, CAL Park, on the grounds of Taiwan Taoyuan International Airport. CAL Park, located at the airport entrance forms a straight line with Terminal 1, Terminal 2, and the future Terminal 3.

Airport hotels
Located adjacent to the Aviation Museum(now closed) and the convention center is the Novotel Taipei Taoyuan International Airport, which opened in November 2009. The 360-room hotel is equipped with restaurants, recreation and fitness centers, and a hair salon and spa.

Aviation museum
The Chung Cheng Aviation Museum was located in the south-eastern area of the airport between the main freeway entrance and the terminals. It was built in 1981 by Boeing under CAA contract. Many retired Republic of China Air Force fighters are represented here. Its purpose is to preserve aviation history and provide public understanding of the civil aviation industry. It is now currently closed due to the expansion and construction of the new Terminal 3.

Awards
 Airport Service Quality (Airports Council International) Best Airport in 15–25 million passengers level (2008)

Future developments

Taoyuan International Airport is undergoing major facility-upgrading and expansion plans. While the South runway (05R/23L) just completed its renovation in January 2015, construction started at the North runway (05L/23R) in March 2015. The runway renovations involve upgrading the runway to Category III and improving the surface conditions. On the other hand, two Terminal 2 gates, C2 and D6, had additional jet bridges installed to accommodate the A380 aircraft. After the runway and jetbridge upgrades, the airport will be able to allow regular A380 operations, with likely carriers being Emirates, China Southern and Singapore Airlines.

Also underway are the Terminal 3, satellite terminal, and third runway plans. Terminal 3 will be designed by Rogers Stirk Harbour + Partners and have an annual capacity of 45 million passengers. Specific plans for the satellite terminal have not been announced. The third runway is expected to be completed by 2025.

The master plan of the airport is the Taoyuan Aerotropolis project, an urban plan aimed at creating an industrial area surrounding Taoyuan Airport. The aerotropolis will take advantage of the competitive local infrastructure to attract developments and help stimulate economic growth. The total area, including the "yolk" airport area and the "white" area, will exceed 6845 hectares. The Terminal 3 and third runway plans are all part of the "yolk" area projects. The official year of completion is 2023. However, due to land resumption controversies, the estimated year may be delayed.

Terminal 2 expansion
With the unanticipated rise of the number of passengers, the Ministry of Transportation has planned an expansion project for Terminal 2, increasing its capacity by 5 million passengers per year from 17 mil to 22 mil.

Terminal 3 construction
In October 2015, it was announced that Rogers Stirk Harbour + Partners won the bid to design the 640,000 square meter terminal. Structures will include a processor (main terminal building), two concourses, and a multi-functional building to connect the terminal with Terminal 2. The processor will have a wave-like roof structure from which lights will be hung. The lights will move up and down to reflect the flow of passengers. Terminal 3 was initially expected to be completed in 2020 and will be able to handle up to 50 million passengers per year, thus increasing the overall yearly capacity of the airport to over 90 million passengers. The opening of the terminal has since been delayed to at least 2023. It is now scheduled to be complete by 2025.

Accidents and incidents
On 28 November 1987, South African Airways flight 295 experienced a catastrophic in-flight fire in the cargo area, broke up in mid-air, and crashed into the Indian Ocean east of Mauritius, killing all 159 people on board. The Boeing 747 combi was flying from Chiang Kai-shek International Airport to Jan Smuts International Airport, Johannesburg, South Africa with a stopover in Plaisance Airport, Plaine Magnien, Mauritius.
On 10 August 1993, Air China Flight 973, a Boeing 767 was hijacked after takeoff from Beijing en route to Jakarta. A 30-year-old Chinese man passed a handwritten note to a flight attendant demanding to be flown to Taiwan. He threatened that his "accomplice" would destroy the aircraft unless he was flown to Taiwan. He was carrying a shampoo bottle containing a mixture of hydrochloric and nitric acids, and he threatened to disfigure nearby passengers with the acid if his demands were ignored. The aircraft was flown to Taoyuan International Airport, where the hijacker surrendered.
Taiwan Taoyuan International Airport was one of many airports targeted by the failed Project Bojinka plot in 1995.
On 16 February 1998, China Airlines Flight 676, which was arriving from Ngurah Rai International Airport, Indonesia, crashed into a residential area while landing in poor weather, killing all 196 people on board and seven on the ground.
On 31 October 2000, Singapore Airlines Flight 006 crashed into construction equipment taking off on the wrong runway, killing 83 of the 179 occupants aboard.

See also

 Taipei Songshan Airport
 Transportation in Taiwan
 Taoyuan Air Base

References

External links
 
 
 

 
1979 establishments in Taiwan
Airports established in 1979